Chainarong Wangganon (born 29 April 1970) is a Thai sprinter. He competed in the men's 4 × 100 metres relay at the 1988 Summer Olympics.

References

1970 births
Living people
Athletes (track and field) at the 1988 Summer Olympics
Chainarong Wangganon
Chainarong Wangganon
Place of birth missing (living people)